Chum Bunrong (born 3 April 1950) served as the Cambodian Ambassador to the United States and Mexico from 2015 to 2018.

References

1950 births
Living people
Cambodian expatriates in the United States
Cambodian military personnel
Ambassadors of Cambodia to the United States
Cambodian People's Party politicians
Place of birth missing (living people)